Buckeye Central High School is a public high school in New Washington, Ohio.  It is the only high school in the Buckeye Central Local School District.

Ohio High School Athletic Association State Championships
 Girls Basketball – 1985
 Girls Volleyball – 1993, 1996

External links
 District Website

Notes and references

High schools in Crawford County, Ohio
Public high schools in Ohio